trybhi.com is an Indian E-commerce portal for home, lifestyle and fashion,  launched in the year 2009.

History
Yebhi, which began as BigShoeBazaar.com, has a registered user base of about 1.5 million people, of whom about half a million have transacted on the site. Nexus Venture Partners and N. R. Narayana Murthy’s Catamaran Ventures invested Rs 40 crore in Agarwal’s company in mid-2011.

On July' 10th 2012, Big Shoe Bazaar India Pvt Ltd. owner of Brand Yebhi.com announced that it has raised INR 100 Cr in Series C round of funding led by Fidelity Growth Partners India and Qualcomm. Subsequently, in April 2013, its site was revamped, along with a new logo.

On 4 September 2014, they changed their business model to coupon store and served Flipkart, Jabong, Myntra, Zovi, Koovs & Zivame  as their clients.

The company launched a new app called Truxapp which connects truck owners to Businesses and raised $3.1 Mn in Pre-Series A funding from investors including Dhoot Family, Sandeep Sharma, V. C. Bothra & Family.

Categories
Initially Yebhi.com has categories lifestyle & Home products and offers products from a range of some 250 brands to its customers dealing in Shoes, Apparels, Bags, Mobiles, Cameras, Sunglasses, Watches, Books, Laptops , Home furnishing, Home décor, Home ware, Lingerie and Fragrances.

Awards 
 5th Loyalty Awards which were presented by AIMIA

See also
 Online shopping
 Ecommerce in India

References

External links
 

Online retailers of India
Companies based in Gurgaon
Retail companies established in 2009
Internet properties established in 2009
2009 establishments in Haryana
Indian companies established in 2009